Constitutional convention may refer to:
Constitutional convention (political custom), an informal and uncodified procedural agreement
Constitutional convention (political meeting), a meeting of delegates to adopt a new constitution or revise an existing constitution

Specific conventions
Constitutional Convention (Australia), any of four gatherings in 1891, 1897–98, 1973, and 1998
Australian Constitutional Convention 1998
Constitutional Convention (Ireland), established in 2012
Constitutional Convention (Philippines)
Scottish Constitutional Convention
Constitutional conventions of the United Kingdom
Icelandic constitutional convention, 2010-2013

United States
Constitutional Convention (United States), wrote the current U. S. Constitution in 1787
Convention to propose amendments to the United States Constitution, one of two processes for proposing amendments
Second Constitutional Convention of the United States, a proposal to reform and rewrite the Constitution
California Constitutional Conventions

See also
Constituent assembly
Constitutional Commission